Arthur Aldersley (25 January 1892 – 17 March 1981) was a New Zealand cricketer. He played in six first-class matches for Wellington from 1909 to 1923.

See also
 List of Wellington representative cricketers

References

External links
 

1892 births
1981 deaths
Cricketers from Rangiora
New Zealand cricketers
Wellington cricketers